Barbershop is a 2002 American comedy drama film directed by Tim Story and written by Mark Brown, Don D. Scott and Marshall Todd, from a story by Brown. The film was produced by George Tillman Jr., Robert Teitel and Brown, and stars Ice Cube, Anthony Anderson, Sean Patrick Thomas, Eve, Troy Garity, Michael Ealy, Leonard Earl Howze, Keith David and Cedric the Entertainer. The film revolves around the social life in a barbershop on the South Side of Chicago. It is the first installment in the Barbershop series.

Barbershop was released on September 13, 2002 by MGM Distribution Co. It received positive reviews from critics, with praise going to the performances of the cast. It went on to become a major commercial success, grossing $77 million worldwide on a $12 million production budget, launching the careers of then-acting newcomers Eve and Ealy.

A sequel, Barbershop 2: Back in Business was released on February 6, 2004, with the original cast returning without director Story, and a third installment, Barbershop: The Next Cut, was released on April 15, 2016, and was directed by Malcolm D. Lee.

Plot
On a cold winter day in Chicago, Calvin Palmer Jr. (Ice Cube) decides he has had enough of trying to keep open the barbershop his father handed down to him. He cannot borrow, revenues are falling, and he seems more interested in get-rich-quick schemes to bring in easy money. Without telling his employees or the customers, he sells the barbershop to a greedy loan shark, Lester Wallace (Keith David), who secretly plans to turn it into a strip club.

After spending a day at work, and realizing just how vital the barbershop is to the surrounding community, Calvin rethinks his decision and tries to get the shop back - only to find out Wallace wants double the $20,000 he paid Calvin to return it, and before 7 pm that day. Right after he admits to the employees that he sold the barber shop, and that it would be closing at the end of the day, the police arrive to arrest one of the barbers, Ricky (Michael Ealy).

Ricky is accused of driving his pickup truck into a nearby market to steal an ATM, but it's revealed that his cousin J.D. (Anthony Anderson) committed the crime after borrowing Ricky's truck. As this would be Ricky's 'third strike', he could be sentenced to life in prison. Calvin uses the $20,000 from Lester to bail Ricky out of jail, but because J.D. was going to let Ricky take the fall without remorse, Ricky is still angry.

Calvin reveals that he found a gun in Ricky's locker in the barbershop and shows it to him. They stop the car and Ricky throws the gun into the river, proving that he does not want to get into any more trouble. Then they both go to confront Lester, as well as J.D. and Billy (Lahmard Tate), who took the ATM to Lester's place without his knowledge, still trying to pry it open. Calvin and Ricky demand that Lester give the barbershop back.

Angered, Lester orders his bodyguard Monk (Kevin Morrow) to pull out his gun. The police arrive just in time to save Calvin and Ricky and arrest J.D. and Billy. Calvin and Ricky see the ATM, and get a $50,000 reward for returning it to police. They get the money, and the barbershop reopens with even better business than before. In the meantime, Calvin's wife Jennifer (Jazsmin Lewis) has given birth to a baby boy.

Cast

Production

Produced on a $12 million budget, Barbershop, with a story by Mark Brown and a screenplay by Brown, Marshall Todd, and Don D. Scott, was filmed in Chicago during the winter of 2001 to early 2002. The filmmakers used a storefront in the South Chicago community area (79th Street and Exchange Avenue) that was once a laundromat to build the set for Calvin's barbershop, and the set was duplicated on a soundstage. Similar to what he achieved with his 1997 film Soul Food, producer George Tillman Jr. wanted to portray African Americans in a more positive and three-dimensional light than many other Hollywood films had in the past. This film also features three original songs by R&B singer/songwriter Sherod Lindsey.

Reception

The film received positive reviews. Metacritic gives the film a weighted average score of 66% based on reviews from 29 critics.
Audiences surveyed by CinemaScore gave the film a grade "A−" on scale of A to F.

Sequels, spin-off and television series

In 2004, MGM released the sequel, Barbershop 2: Back in Business. All of the original cast returned, but director Tim Story did not. This film was directed by Kevin Rodney Sullivan. In the same year, Billie Woodruff directed a spin-off film entitled Beauty Shop, with Queen Latifah as the lead (Latifah's character made her debut in Barbershop 2). Beauty Shop was pushed back from a late summer 2004 release, and finally reached theaters in March 2005.

During the fall of 2005, State Street and Ice Cube debuted Barbershop: The Series on the Showtime cable network, with Omar Gooding taking over Ice Cube's role of Calvin. The character "Dinka" is renamed "Yinka" on Barbershop: The Series, as "Dinka" is not a typical Nigerian name (although a certain tribe in the Nigerian middle belt bears the name "Dimka"). In addition, Isaac's last name is changed from "Rosenberg" to "Brice", and the character Ricky has been replaced by a more hardened ex-con, Romadal.

In 2014, a third Barbershop film was announced, titled Barbershop: The Next Cut. In late March of that year, MGM executives revealed that they have been negotiating deals with Ice Cube to appear in the film. A year later, MGM announced that the studio has been setting up deals with Cedric the Entertainer, Queen Latifah, Lisa Maffia, and Nicki Minaj to appear in the film. Malcolm D. Lee directed the film and New Line Cinema distributed it. The film was released on April 15, 2016.

Soundtrack

A soundtrack containing hip hop and R&B music was released on August 27, 2002 by Epic Records. It peaked at #29 on the Billboard 200 and #9 on the Top R&B/Hip-Hop Albums.

See also 
 List of hood films

References

External links
 
 
 
 Ice Cube interview for Barbershop

2002 films
2002 comedy films
African-American comedy films
Films set in Chicago
Films shot in Chicago
Films about race and ethnicity
Films directed by Tim Story
Metro-Goldwyn-Mayer films
Cube Vision films
Films scored by Terence Blanchard
Barbershop (franchise)
2000s English-language films
2000s American films
African-American films